John Anthony Genzale (July 15, 1952 – April 23, 1991), known professionally as Johnny Thunders, was an American guitarist, singer and songwriter. He came to prominence in the early 1970s as a member of the New York Dolls. He later played with the Heartbreakers and as a solo artist.

Early life and career

Thunders was born John Anthony Genzale in Queens, New York, the second child of Josephine Genzale (née Nicoletti, 1923–1999), who was of Italian descent, and Emil Genzale (1923–1982), who was of Italian, Russian-Jewish, and German-Jewish ancestry. Thunders had an older sister, Mariann (1946–2009). He first lived in East Elmhurst and then Jackson Heights.

His first musical performance was in the winter of 1967 with The Reign. Shortly thereafter, he played with Johnny and the Jaywalkers, under the name Johnny Volume, at Quintano's School for Young Professionals, around the corner from Carnegie Hall, on 56th Street near 7th Avenue.

In 1968, he began going to the Fillmore East and Bethesda Fountain in Central Park on weekends. His older sister, Mariann, started styling his hair like Keith Richards. In late 1969, he got a job as a sales clerk at D'Naz leather shop, on Bleecker Street in the West Village, and started trying to put a band together. He and his girlfriend, Janis Cafasso, went to see The Rolling Stones at Madison Square Garden in November 1969, and they appear in the Maysles' film Gimme Shelter.

Dolls bass guitarist Arthur "Killer" Kane later wrote about Thunders' guitar sound, as he described arriving outside the rehearsal studio where they were meeting to jam together for the first time: "I heard someone playing a guitar riff that I myself didn't know how to play.  It was raunchy, nasty, rough, raw, and untamed. I thought it was truly inspired...", adding "His sound was rich and fat and beautiful, like a voice."

The New York Dolls were signed to Mercury Records, with the help of A & R man Paul Nelson. Thunders recorded two albums with the band, New York Dolls and Too Much Too Soon. They were managed by Marty Thau, and booked by Leber & Krebs. Subsequently, they worked with Malcolm McLaren for several months, later becoming a prototype for the Sex Pistols.

In 1975 Thunders and Nolan left the band; Thunders later blamed McLaren for the band's demise. Johansen and Sylvain continued playing, along with Peter Jordon, Tony Machine (an ex-assistant agent at Leber & Krebs) and Chris Robison, as the New York Dolls until late 1978.

Post-New York Dolls

The Heartbreakers
Thunders formed The Heartbreakers with former New York Dolls drummer Jerry Nolan and former Television bassist Richard Hell. Walter Lure, former guitarist for the New York City punk band The Demons joined them soon after. After conflict arose between Thunders and Hell, Hell left to form Richard Hell and the Voidoids and was replaced by Billy Rath. With Thunders leading the band, the Heartbreakers toured America before going to the UK to join the Sex Pistols, The Clash and The Damned on the Anarchy Tour. The group stayed in the UK throughout 1977, where their popularity was significantly greater than in the U.S., particularly among punk bands. While in the UK they were signed to Track Records and released their only official studio album, L.A.M.F., an abbreviation for "Like A Mother Fucker". L.A.M.F. was received positively by critics, but was criticised for its poor production. Displeased with the production, the band members were competing with one other, mixing and remixing the record, culminating in drummer Jerry Nolan quitting in November 1977. Shortly thereafter, the Heartbreakers disbanded.

Solo, Gang War and Heartbreakers reunion
Thunders stayed in London and recorded the first of a number of solo albums, beginning with So Alone in 1978. The drug-fuelled recording sessions featured a core band of Thunders, bassist Phil Lynott, drummer Paul Cook and guitarist Steve Jones, with guest appearances from Chrissie Hynde, Steve Marriott, Walter Lure, Billy Rath and Peter Perrett. The CD version of the album contains four bonus tracks, including the single "Dead or Alive" and a cover of the early Marc Bolan song "The Wizard". Soon afterwards, Thunders moved back to the US, joining former Heartbreakers Walter Lure, Billy Rath and sometimes Jerry Nolan for gigs at Max's Kansas City. Around this time Thunders played a small number of gigs at London's The Speakeasy Club with a line up including Cook and Jones, Henri Paul on bass and Judy Nylon and Patti Palladin (Snatch) as back up vocalists.

In late 1979, Thunders moved to Detroit with his wife Julie and began performing in a band called Gang War. Other members included John Morgan, Ron Cooke, Philippe Marcade and former MC5 guitarist Wayne Kramer. They recorded several demos and performed live several times before disbanding.  Zodiac Records released an EP of their demos in 1987. In 1990 they also released an album titled Gang War, which was credited to Thunders and Kramer.

During the early 1980s, Thunders re-formed The Heartbreakers for various tours; the group recorded their final album, Live at the Lyceum, in 1984. The concert was also filmed and released as a video and later a DVD titled Dead Or Alive.

France, collaborations and final years
In the 1980s, Thunders lived in Paris and Stockholm with his wife and daughter. In 1985 he released Que Sera Sera, a collection of new songs with his then band The Black Cats, and "Crawfish", a duet with former Snatch vocalist Patti Palladin. Three years later he again teamed up with Palladin to release Copy Cats, a covers album. The album, produced by Palladin, featured a wide assortment of musicians to recreate the 1950s and 1960s sound of the originals, including Alex Balanescu on violin, Bob Andrews on piano, The Only Ones John Perry and others on guitar, and a horn section.

From August 1988 until his death in April 1991, Thunders performed in The Oddballs, with Jamie Heath (saxophone), Alison Gordy (vocals), Chris Musto (drums), Stevie Klasson (guitar) and Jill Wisoff (bass). From April–May 1990, Johnny performed an acoustic tour of the UK and Ireland joining up occasionally with John, Sam and Peter of The Golden Horde, whom he had met and played with previously in 1984 at the TV Club, and were concurrently on tour (of the UK and Ireland) at that time also, for full-band electric performances and TV appearances. On May 8, 1990, recording sessions in London for a joint EP-single cover version with The Golden Horde of "Sugar, Sugar" by The Archies, and original material, had to be cancelled when Johnny experienced health problems following his performances in Wakefield, UK while on tour.

His final recording was a version of "Born To Lose", with German punk rock band Die Toten Hosen, recorded 36 hours before his death in New Orleans.

Death
Rumors surround Thunders' death at the Inn on St. Peter hotel (formerly known as St. Peter Guest House) in New Orleans, Louisiana on April 23, 1991.

Thunders apparently died of drug-related causes, but it has been speculated that it was the result of foul play.  According to his biography Lobotomy: Surviving The Ramones, Dee Dee Ramone took a call in New York City the next day from Stevie Klasson, Johnny's rhythm guitar player. Ramone said, "They told me that Johnny had gotten mixed up with some bastards... who ripped him off for his methadone supply. They had given him LSD and then murdered him. He had gotten a pretty large supply of methadone in England, so he could travel and stay away from those creeps – the drug dealers, Thunders imitators, and losers like that."

Singer Willy DeVille, who lived next door to the hotel in which Thunders died, described his death this way:

There is conflicting information about the New Orleans' coroner's report.

An article in the Orlando Sentinel states: "[He] died of an overdose of cocaine and methadone, according to the coroner's office in New Orleans. Chief investigator John Gagliano said tests completed last week found substantial amounts of both drugs."

However, other sources state that an autopsy was conducted by the New Orleans coroner, but served only to compound the mystery. According to Thunders' biographer Nina Antonia as posted on the Jungle Records website, the level of drugs found in his system was not fatal. According to the book Rock Bottom: Dark Moments in Music Babylon by Pamela Des Barres, who interviewed Thunders' sister, Mariann Bracken, the autopsy confirmed evidence of advanced leukemia, which would explain the decline in Thunders' appearance in the final year of his life.

In a 1994 Melody Maker interview, Thunders' manager Mick Webster described the family's efforts to get New Orleans police to investigate the matter further: "We keep asking the New Orleans police to re-investigate, but they haven't been particularly friendly. They seemed to think that this was just another junkie who had wandered into town and died. They simply weren't interested."

Thunders was survived by his wife Julie Jourden and four children: sons John, Vito, and Dino, and daughter Jamie Genzale by Susanne Blomqvist.

Discography

Studio albums
 So Alone (1978)
 In Cold Blood (1983)
 Diary of a Lover (1983)
 Hurt Me (1983)
 Que Sera Sera (1985)
 Copy Cats (1988)

Official live albums and compilations
 The New Too Much Junkie Business (1983)
 Stations of the Cross (1987)
 Bootlegging the Bootleggers (1990)
 Live in Japan (1991)
 Have Faith (1992)
 Saddest Vacation Act. 1 (1993)
 Saddest Vacation Act. 2 (1993)
 Chinese Rocks: The Ultimate Thunders Live Collection (1993)
 Add Water & Stir (1994)
 Stations of the Cross (Revisited) (1994)
 The Studio Bootlegs (1996)
 Belfast Rocks (1997)
 Born Too Loose: The Best of Johnny Thunders (1999)
 Live at Leeds (1999)
 Play with Fire (2000)
 Endless Party (2000)
 Panic on the Sunset Strip (2000)
 Live & Wasted: Unplugged 1990 (2001)
 Eve of Destruction (2005)

Official singles and EPs
 "Dead or Alive" 7" (1978)
 "You Can't Put Your Arms Around a Memory" (1978)
 "Twist And Shout/Boys" ( live at Max's with Jimi LaLumia & The Psychotic Frogs; 1981)
 "In Cold Blood" (1983)
 "Hurt Me" (1984)
 "Crawfish (1985)
 "Que Sera Sera (1988)

Filmography
 Story of a Junkie directed by Lech Kowalski 1987
 Mona et moi (1989), directed by Patrick Grandperret, Prix Jean Vigo 1990
 Born To Lose – The Last Rock'n'Roll Movie (1999), directed by Lech Kowalski
 Looking For Johnny: The Legend of Johnny Thunders (2014), directed by Danny Garcia
 Room 37 (2019), directed by Vicente and Fernando Cordero

References

External links

 Biography at AllMusic
 

New York Dolls members
1952 births
1991 deaths
Lead guitarists
American punk rock guitarists
American punk rock singers
ROIR artists
Songwriters from New York (state)
American expatriates in Sweden
American expatriates in the United Kingdom
American expatriates in France
American people of Italian descent
Protopunk musicians
20th-century American singers
Glam rock musicians
20th-century American guitarists
Glam punk musicians
American male guitarists
The Heartbreakers (punk rock band) members
20th-century American male singers
People from Jackson Heights, Queens
American male songwriters